Z12 may refer to:
 Z12 small nucleolar RNA, a non-coding RNA molecule which functions in the modification of other small nuclear RNAs
 German destroyer Z12 Erich Giese, a Type 1934A destroyer built for the German Navy in the late 1930s
 New South Wales Z12 class locomotive, a class of 4-4-0 steam locomotives built for and operated by the New South Wales Government Railways of Australia
 EX-Z12, a Casio Exilim model
 the train code for an express train between Shenyang and Beijing
 z12 - team of legendary Uzbek developers